Zadny Dvor is a rural locality (a village) in Gorodishchenskoye Rural Settlement, Nyuksensky District, Vologda Oblast, Russia. The population was 12 as of 2002.

Geography 
Zadny Dvor is located 44 km southeast of Nyuksenitsa (the district's administrative centre) by road. Kosmarevskaya Kuliga is the nearest rural locality.

References 

Rural localities in Nyuksensky District